Mary "Pepper" Carey (September 8, 1925 – January 1, 1977) was a utility infielder who played from  through  in the All-American Girls Professional Baseball League. She was born in Detroit, Michigan.

Mary Carey was a dependable infielder during her nine years in the league. A solid fielder with sure hands and a good throwing arm, she saw action at third base, shortstop and second base for six different teams.

Her most productive season at the plate came with the Peoria Redwings in 1950, when she posted career numbers with a .235 average, 97 hits, 14 extrabases and 54 runs scored. She also co-managed the team that year as well.

She is part of Women in Baseball, a permanent display at the Baseball Hall of Fame and Museum at Cooperstown, New York unveiled in 1988, which is dedicated to the entire All-American Girls Professional Baseball League.

Mary Carey died in 1977 in her homeland of Detroit, Michigan, at the age of 51.

Career statistics
Batting

Fielding

Sources

All-American Girls Professional Baseball League managers
All-American Girls Professional Baseball League players
Kenosha Comets players
Peoria Redwings players
Kalamazoo Lassies players
Muskegon Belles players
Rockford Peaches players
South Bend Blue Sox players
Baseball infielders
Baseball players from Detroit
1925 births
1977 deaths
20th-century American women